Casey Jones is an American Western series syndicated during the 1957–58 television season. It was based upon the life of late 19th-century engineer Casey Jones in the era of pioneering western railroads. Casey Jones also aired on the BBC in the United Kingdom and on the Seven Network in Australia.

Synopsis
The series is set in the late 19th century, featuring the adventures of railroad engineer Casey Jones and the crew of the Cannonball Express steam locomotive, fireman Wallie Sims and conductor Redrock Smith, working for the Midwest and Central Railroad. Casey lived in the fictional Missouri town of Midvale, within commuting distance of St. Louis, with his wife, Alice, their young son, Casey, Jr., and their dog Cinders. Although there really was a famous locomotive engineer named Casey Jones of the Illinois Central Railroad, the television series is only loosely based on him. His train is named "Cannonball Express" (the real Jones' locomotive, #382, was nicknamed "Cannonball"). The name of the character Wallie Sims is a conflation of Illinois Central employee Wallace Saunders, who wrote the earliest version of "The Ballad of Casey Jones," and the real Jones' fireman, Simeon "Sim" Webb. Unlike Wallie Sims, both Saunders and Webb were black.

Kenneth Gamet, the producer of Casey Jones, offers a gentler Western series against the more violent adult shows of the time. Casey Jones features the same classical types of plots as other westerns such as train robbers and vandals, but the episodes center as much on Casey's interaction with his family, particularly Casey, Jr.

Cast list

Regulars
 Alan Hale as Casey Jones
 Bobby Clark as Casey, Jr.
 Dub Taylor as Wallie Sims
 Eddy Waller as Red Rock
 Mary Lawrence as Alice Jones

Semi-regulars
 Jim Bannon as Sheriff Tynes
 Paul Keast as Nathaniel Carter

Production notes
Commissioned by Los Angeles television station KTTV, it was shot on a special set at Ray "Crash" Corrigan's studio Corriganville in the Simi Valley, California.

Shot for one season, in part because of Alan Hale's commitment to filming episodes of Rory Calhoun's The Texan, the series ran for 32 half-hour black-and-white episodes. Its theme song was a version of the "Ballad of Casey Jones".

The regular version of the opening titles features Alan Hale with Bobby Clark in the cab and credits Mary Lawrence, but the inclusion of Cinders is inconsistent. A reversed image is used in a close up of the Cannonball and the nameplate can be seen as reversed behind the show title.

There are alternate versions of the closing credits. Both feature Alan Hale and Bobby Clark waving from the cab, the second features different shots of the Cannonball, including one of it passing over a trestle and the brow of a hill, and a different version of the song with slight amendments to the lyrics (to include Cinders). Alan Hale filmed an introduction to the first episode on set with Bobby Clark where he introduced the new series to the audience.

The locomotive used in location footage was Sierra No. 3, which was also used in many other television shows and films. The railroad scenes were filmed on the Sierra Railroad in Tuolumne County, California.

Episode list

Broadcast
In the UK, the series was shown by ITV's London contractor, Associated Rediffusion, from 8 November 1961 to 21 February 1962 (16 episodes), and from 4 April 1962 to 30 May 1962 (a further 9 episodes).
According to issues of the UK Radio Times magazine, the series was shown in the UK on BBC1, the first run commencing on 8 November 1967, with a second run from 21 March 1969. Both runs showed only 26 episodes of the series. The last screening of an episode by the BBC was in August 1975. As of April 2021, the show is airing on the Sony-owned getTV network. In the mid-90s, it also aired on FX Australia.

References

External links
 
 Jones Titles on YouTube

1958 American television series debuts
1958 American television series endings
TV series
1950s American children's television series
1950s American drama television series
Television series set in the 19th century
Black-and-white American television shows
English-language television shows
First-run syndicated television programs in the United States
Television series by Sony Pictures Television
Television shows set in St. Louis
1950s Western (genre) television series
American folklore films and television series
Television series by Screen Gems
Television series about rail transport